Nurbek Kaaryevich Alimbekov (born 13 March 1975) is a Kyrgyz politician, and current member of the Supreme Council of Kyrgyzstan.

Early life and education
Alimbekov was born on 13 March 1975 in the village of Papan in Osh Oblast in the Kirgiz SSR, now Kyrgyzstan. In 1997 he graduated from Osh Technical University with a degree in technical engineering. He continued his education there in the law faculty, graduating in 2000.

In 2007 he returned to education at Kyrgyz State National University with a degree in finance and credit and in 2012 entered the Academy of Management under the President of the Kyrgyz Republic. Since 2008 he has been a post-graduate economics student of Bishkek State University.

Career

Early career, 2003–2005
In 2003 Alimbekov joined as a director of a state enterprise that had the same name as his surname – "Alimbekov". He then moved, in 2005, to work for a year as a specialist for the Ministry of Finance.

Company director and local Bishkek deputy, 2008–2010
In 2008, Alimbekov joined the company "Papan Kurulush" as a director, and was also elected to the Bishkek City Kenesh, where he was head of the group of deputies representing the Sverdlovsk district of the city.

Jogorku Kenesh deputy, 2010–present
Alimbekov was elected as deputy for the Respublika Party of Kyrgyzstan in the 2010 parliamentary election. In that convocation he was deputy chairman of the Committee for Transport, Communications, Architecture and Construction.

In the 2015 parliamentary election he changed his affiliation to the Kyrgyzstan Party.

Personal life
Alimbekov is married, and has five children.

See also
List of members of the Supreme Council (Kyrgyzstan), 2015–present

References

Living people
1975 births
People from Osh Region
Members of the Supreme Council (Kyrgyzstan)
Kyrgyz National University alumni